The Fort Myers Tarpons was a 2007 expansion team from the National Indoor Football League.  They played their home games at the Lee County Civic Arena in Fort Myers, Florida.  They won both of their games, one at home and one on the road, before suddenly folding.  The team was the second attempt at an arena/indoor football team since the Florida Firecats of af2 (2002-2009) and followed by the Florida Tarpons (not related), now of the American Arena League.

Season-by-season 

|-
|2007 || 2 || 0 || 0 || N/A || --

References

National Indoor Football League teams
Fort Myers, Florida
American football teams in Florida